Thioredoxin-like protein 4A is a protein that is encoded by the TXNL4A gene in humans.

Interactions 

TXNL4A has been shown to interact with PQBP1.

References

Further reading